Ignacio Bayón Mariné (born 14 February 1944) is a Spanish politician who served as Minister of Industry and Energy from May 1980 to December 1982.

References

1944 births
Living people
Complutense University of Madrid alumni
Government ministers of Spain
20th-century Spanish politicians
Industry ministers of Spain
People from Madrid